Alan Willey (16 September 1941 – 28 April 2017) was an English professional footballer who played for Bridgwater Town, Millwall and Oxford United. Having started out in football as a groundstaff boy for Exeter City, he signed for Bridgwater Town before moving to Oxford United for £300. He joined Millwall in 1966.

Notes

References
 

1941 births
2017 deaths
Sportspeople from Exeter
Association football forwards
English footballers
Bridgwater Town F.C. players
Millwall F.C. players
Oxford United F.C. players
Southern Football League players
English Football League players